Luther Mutyambizi (born 26 June 1980) is a Zimbabwean cricketer. He made his first-class debut in the 1999/00 season.

References

External links
 

1980 births
Living people
Zimbabwean cricketers
Centrals cricketers
Midlands cricketers
Mid West Rhinos cricketers
Sportspeople from Gweru